Blue Condition may refer to:

 Blue Condition, a 1996 album by Bobby Caldwell
 "Blue Condition", a song by Cream from Disraeli Gears